Beast Within is the second studio album by the Finnish symphonic metal band Katra, released on August 29, 2008 through the independent record label Napalm Records.

Track listing 
 "Grail of Sahara" – 3:27
 "Forgotten Bride" – 4:22
 "Beast Within" – 3:57
 "Fade to Gray" – 4:49
 "Swear" – 3:45
 "Promise Me Everything" – 4:22
 "Mystery" – 3:08
 "Flow" – 4:05
 "Scars in My Heart" – 3:50
 "Storm Rider" – 4:22
 "Mist of Dawn" – 4:26
 "Kuunpoika" – 4:27

Personnel 
 Katra Solopuro – vocals
 Teemu Mätäsjärvi – guitar
 Kristian Kangasniemi – guitar
 Johannes Tolonen – bass
 Matti Auerkallio – drums

Reception 
Metal Temple rated it 5/10 stars ("mediocre"), and wrote, "Beast Within is a nicely produced work by a new band consisted of great musicians but – for me – the problem is that this album doesn't offer something new, music wise."

References

External links 
 

2008 albums